Finn Crockett (born 30 June 1999) is a Scottish cyclist, who currently rides for UCI Continental team . He won the bronze medal in the road race at the 2022 Commonwealth Games.

Major results
2022
 1st Rutland–Melton CiCLE Classic
 3rd  Road race, Commonwealth Games
 9th Overall Tour du Loir-et-Cher

References

External links
 

1999 births
Living people
British male cyclists
Scottish male cyclists
Cyclists at the 2022 Commonwealth Games
Commonwealth Games bronze medallists for Scotland
Commonwealth Games medallists in cycling
Medallists at the 2022 Commonwealth Games